The League of Legends Continental League (LCL) is the top level of professional League of Legends competition in the Commonwealth of Independent States, organized by Riot Games Russia. It replaced the SLTV StarSeries that was organized by StarLadder in 2016. There are eight teams in the league. Each annual season of play is divided into two splits, spring and summer, both consisting of five weeks of double round-robin tournament play, which then conclude with a play-off single elimination tournament between the top four teams. The winners of each split qualifies for the Mid-Season Invitational and the World Championship.

Prize pool of the competition in 2016 and 2017 amounts ₽4,5 million per season.

Results

As SLTV StarSeries

As LCL

See also 
 League of Legends Championship Series, equivalent competition in North America
 League of Legends European Championship, equivalent competition in Europe

References

External links 
  

League of Legends competitions
Sports leagues in Russia
Esports competitions in Russia